Cruz is a line of Android-based e-book readers and tablet computers by Velocity Micro, a privately held computer manufacturer located in Richmond, Virginia that specializes in custom high-end computers.

History 
Cruz debuted in 2010, when Velocity Micro announced the release of the Cruz Reader and Cruz Tablet.  These devices are Android-based multimedia gadgets.  Both devices feature 7" full color screens.  The Cruz Reader utilizes a resistive touchscreen, whereas the Cruz Tablet makes use of the more advanced and responsive capacitive touch screen.

At CES 2011, Velocity Micro unveiled plans to release three new tablets, including 10" and 8" models, as well as another 7" tablet. The specific release dates and estimated retail prices are not currently available. It was reported that these new tablets, operating on Android 2.2 or Android 2.3, would feature dual cameras, Tegra processors, Bluetooth 2.1, GPS, and Micro HDMI out.  Velocity Micro also announced plans to release in 2011 the Android-based Cruz Watch.

Cruz Reader 
The Cruz Reader is an Android 2.0-based e-book reader.  It has a 7-inch full color, 800 × 600 resolution resistive touchscreen. The Cruz Reader's pre-installed e-book reading app is the Borders Group e-book reader application. However, because Borders is now defunct, Velocity Micro has released a firmware update that changes the e-book reader application to Kobo Inc.'s. The only models are the R101, R102, and R103.

Cruz Tablet 
Cruz Tablets represent Velocity Micro's higher-end Android-based devices. They all use a capacitive touchscreen. The original Cruz Tablet (model T103, 104, or 105) is a widescreen-format (16:9) device. A later version of the Cruz Tablet (model T301) was released in December 2010 with a 4:3 7" screen and Kindle for Android application pre-installed. In addition, the T408 and T410 have refurbished models available.

Models include:

 Cruz T100 series (Android 2.0, upgradable to Android 2.2)
 T103
 T104
 T105
 Cruz T301 (Android 2.0, upgradable to Android 2.2)
 Cruz PS37 (Android 2.3)
 Cruz T400 series (Android 2.3)
 Cruz T408
 Cruz T410
 Cruz T500 series (Android 4.0.3)
 Cruz T501 (not yet available)
 Cruz T507 (not yet available)
 Cruz T508
 Cruz T510

The T100 and T301 tablets have a problem where the browser will crash when google.com or websites that use Google Analytics are accessed. Velocity Micro addresses this on its website as a Google JavaScript problem. Attempts at addressing this issue through the velocitymicro.com support receive this response: "The update Google has implemented to their search engine isn't compatible to the T100 series hardware.  The device is a legacy model."

Model comparison

Notes

Retailers 
Cruz devices were sold in several major consumer electronics retailers in the United States including Best Buy, Borders, Sears, QVC, and Amazon.

The model T104 was sold by woot.com on 29 May 2012.

References

External links 

Cruz blog

Dedicated ebook devices
Tablet computers
Android (operating system) devices